The Dance of Death (German:Der Totentanz) is a 1912 German silent film directed by Urban Gad and starring Asta Nielsen. It was one of the first films made at the new Babelsberg Studio in Berlin.

Cast
 Asta Nielsen as Bella Burk 
 Oskar Fuchs as Ingenieur Burk  
 Fritz Weidemann as Komponist Czerneck  
 Fred Immler 
 Emil Albes

References

Bibliography
 Jennifer M. Kapczynski & Michael D. Richardson. A New History of German Cinema.

External links

Der Totentanz on filmportal.de (in English)

1912 films
Films of the German Empire
Films directed by Urban Gad
German silent short films
German black-and-white films
1910s German films